Ayao Amen Sossou (born May 24, 1990) is a Togolese footballer.

Career

College and amateur
Sossou played three years of college soccer at Virginia Military Institute between 2008 and 2010.

Professional
Sossou spent 2011 with Finnish club I-Kissat and 2013, again in Finland, with TPV. Sossou returned to the United States on January 30, 2014, when he joined USL Pro club Rochester Rhinos. For the 2016 season, Sossou joined PDL expansion team, Tormenta FC, becoming the first ever player to sign with the club, where he played for three seasons.

References

1990 births
Living people
Togolese footballers
Togolese expatriate footballers
Rochester New York FC players
USL Championship players
Association football defenders
USL League Two players
Tormenta FC 2 players
Tormenta FC players
VMI Keydets men's soccer
College men's soccer players in the United States
21st-century Togolese people